Astronautic Technology Sdn Bhd or better known as ATSB was established on 1 May 1995 and is wholly owned by the Minister of Finance Inc under the supervision of the Malaysian Ministry of Energy, Science, Technology, Environment and Climate Change (MESTECC).

As a wholly owned company under the Ministry of Finance Inc., ATSB is mandated to focus on research and development in the area of design and development of space-qualified systems employing advanced and innovative technologies.

Space projects

ATSB was entrusted with the design, development, launch and operation of TiungSAT-1, Malaysia's first microsatellite that was launched aboard a Dnepr rocket from Baikonur Cosmodrome, Kazakhstan on 26 September 2000.

The technical expertise and experience gained in handling TiungSAT-1 served as a stepping stone for the second microsatellite, RazakSAT, which was successfully launched on 14 July 2009. RazakSat failed after a year, and never became fully operational.

ATSB developed the cubesat InnoSAT-2 that was launched on 29 Nov 2018 by ISRO. InnoSAT-2 carried a dosimeter, a CMOS camera and an experimental reaction wheel. The satellite bus was locally developed.

Other projects

Differential Global Navigation Satellite System or DGNSS was developed and deployed worldwide in response to the resolution A.915(22) by the International Malaysia Marine Department Organisation. The Peninsular Malaysia Marine Department has established a network of DGNSS broadcasting stations that are supported by monitoring stations and a national control center.

Products
TiungSAT
RazakSAT
InnoSAT
Pipit
Differential Global Navigation Satellite System (DGNSS)

See also
Independence-X Aerospace
Borneo SubOrbitals

References

External links
https://web.archive.org/web/20191224182918/https://www.atsb.my/
https://www.mestecc.gov.my/web/
https://web.archive.org/web/20090724100826/http://www.angkasa.gov.my/welcome/index.html

Government-owned companies of Malaysia
Spacecraft manufacturers
Science and technology in Malaysia
Engineering companies of Malaysia
Scientific organisations based in Malaysia
Companies established in 1995
1995 establishments in Malaysia
Ministry of Energy, Technology, Science, Climate Change and Environment (Malaysia)
Minister of Finance (Incorporated) (Malaysia)
Privately held companies of Malaysia
Malaysian brands
Aerospace companies of Malaysia
Aircraft engineering companies
Rocket engine manufacturers of Malaysia